Virendra Narayan Yadav is a leader of the Janata Dal (United) and a member of the Bihar Legislative Council from Saran. His term is 2017 to 2023.

References

Janata Dal (United) politicians
Living people
Members of the Bihar Legislative Council
Bihari politicians
Year of birth missing (living people)